Łukasz Grzeszczuk (born 3 March 1990 in Warsaw) is a Polish athlete specialising in the javelin throw. He represented his country at the 2013 World Championships without qualifying for the final.

His personal best in the event is 84.77 metres set in Riga in 2014.

International competitions

Seasonal progression

2009 - 73.55
2010 - 76.65
2011 - 80.58
2012 - 79.40
2013 - 83.98
2014 - 84.77
2016 - 83.60

References

External links 
 
 
 
 

1990 births
Living people
Polish male javelin throwers
World Athletics Championships athletes for Poland
Athletes from Warsaw
Athletes (track and field) at the 2016 Summer Olympics
Olympic athletes of Poland
Competitors at the 2011 Summer Universiade
Competitors at the 2013 Summer Universiade